So Big may refer to:

So Big (novel), a 1924 novel written by Edna Ferber
So Big (1924 film), a 1924 film adaptation directed by Charles Brabin
So Big (1932 film), a 1932 film adaptation starring Barbara Stanwyck
So Big (1953 film), a 1953 film adaptation directed by Robert Wise
So Big! (book), a Sesame Street spin-off book, see Sesame Beginnings
"So Big" (song), a song by Iyaz